Eldmire with Crakehill is a civil parish in the Hambleton district of North Yorkshire, England.  The population of the parish was estimated at 30 in 2013.

There is no village in the parish.  The parish consists of a number of scattered houses and farms, including the hamlets of Eldmire and Crakehill on the east bank of the River Swale.  Crakehill was mentioned in the Domesday Book (as Crecala).  It was joined with the manor of Eldmire (also spelt Elmire) from at least the early 14th century.  The two settlements formed a township in the ancient parish of Topcliffe, and became a separate civil parish in 1866.

References

External links 

Civil parishes in North Yorkshire